Severino Rigoni (3 October 1914 – 14 December 1992) was an Italian cyclist who won a silver medal in the 4 km team pursuit at the 1936 Summer Olympics. After the Olympics he turned professional and competed on track in Italy (1938–45) and later on the road in Germany, United States, United Kingdom, Algeria and Brazil. He won six-day road races in Berlin (1949), New York City (1950), Münster (1951), Rio de Janeiro (1956) and São Paulo (1957). On track he won the national sprint title in 1935, placing second or third in 1934, 1936, 1938, 1940, 1943 and 1945.

References

Italian male cyclists
1914 births
1992 deaths
Olympic silver medalists for Italy
Cyclists at the 1936 Summer Olympics
Olympic cyclists of Italy
Olympic medalists in cycling
Cyclists from the Province of Vicenza
Medalists at the 1936 Summer Olympics